Kārlis Skrastiņš (July 9, 1974 – September 7, 2011) was a Latvian professional ice hockey player. Skrastiņš was drafted by the Nashville Predators of the National Hockey League in 1998 as a defenceman and spent twelve years in the league playing for the Predators, the Colorado Avalanche, the Florida Panthers, and the Dallas Stars.

For the 2011-2012 season, Skrastiņš left the NHL and signed a contract to play in Russia for Lokomotiv Yaroslavl of the Kontinental Hockey League (KHL). However, he never got to play a game for Lokomotiv as he was killed in the 2011 Lokomotiv Yaroslavl plane crash that killed almost the entire team on September 7, 2011.

Playing career
Skrastiņš was drafted by Nashville Predators with the 230th pick in the ninth round of 1998 NHL Entry Draft. On October 15, 2002, against the New York Islanders, he scored a 5-on-3 shorthanded goal. He played for Nashville for five seasons until being traded to the Colorado Avalanche in 2003. On February 8, 2007, he played in his 487th consecutive game to pass Tim Horton for the longest playing streak in NHL history for a defenceman. Skrastiņš' streak ended at 495 games, when he missed a February 25, 2007 game against the Anaheim Ducks with a knee injury. He had previously missed only one other game due to injury in his career — against St. Louis on February 18, 2000, with a minor shoulder injury. The streak led to him being given the nickname "Ironman".

In his fourth season with the Avalanche in 2007–08, he was traded to the Florida Panthers for Ruslan Salei (who also died in the Lokomotiv plane crash) on February 26, 2008. In his first full season with the Panthers in 2008–09, Skrastiņš scored a career high 18 points in 80 games. On October 16, 2008, he played his 600th career NHL game against the Minnesota Wild and on November 1, 2008, he scored his 100th point in his NHL career in a 3–2 loss fittingly against his original club, the Nashville Predators.

On July 2, 2009, he was signed by the Dallas Stars to a two-year contract worth $2.75 million. He scored his only two goals of the 2009–10 season, including the game winner, on December 19 in a 4–3 Stars victory over the Detroit Red Wings.

On May 17, 2011, after eleven seasons in the NHL, Skrastiņš left to sign a contract with Russian team, Lokomotiv Yaroslavl.

Death

Skrastins died on September 7, 2011, when a Yakovlev Yak-42 passenger aircraft, carrying nearly the entire Lokomotiv Yaroslavl team, crashed just outside Yaroslavl, Russia. The team was traveling to Minsk to play their opening game of the season, with its coaching staff and prospects. Lokomotiv officials said "'everyone from the main roster was on the plane plus four players from the youth team.'"

Career statistics

Regular season and playoffs

International

See also
List of ice hockey players who died during their playing career

References

External links
 

1974 births
2011 deaths
Colorado Avalanche players
Dallas Stars players
Florida Panthers players
Ice hockey players at the 2002 Winter Olympics
Ice hockey players at the 2006 Winter Olympics
Ice hockey players at the 2010 Winter Olympics
Latvian ice hockey defencemen
Milwaukee Admirals (IHL) players
Nashville Predators draft picks
Nashville Predators players
Olympic ice hockey players of Latvia
Ice hockey people from Riga
HC TPS players
Victims of the Lokomotiv Yaroslavl plane crash
Expatriate ice hockey players in the United States
Expatriate ice hockey players in Russia
Expatriate ice hockey players in Finland
Latvian expatriate sportspeople in the United States
Latvian expatriate sportspeople in Finland
Latvian expatriate sportspeople in Russia
Latvian expatriate ice hockey people